In mathematics, more specifically in the field of analytic number theory, a Landau–Siegel zero or simply Siegel zero (also known as exceptional zero), named after Edmund Landau and Carl Ludwig Siegel, is a type of potential counterexample to the generalized Riemann hypothesis, on the zeros of Dirichlet L-functions associated to quadratic number fields.

Motivation and definition
The way in which Siegel zeros appear in the theory of Dirichlet L-functions is as potential exceptions to the classical zero-free regions, which can only occur when the L-function is associated to a real Dirichlet character.

Real primitive Dirichlet characters 

For an integer , a Dirichlet character modulo  is an arithmetic function  satisfying the following properties:
 (Completely multiplicative)  for every , ;
 (Periodic)  for every ;
 (Support)  if .
That is,  is the lifting of a homomorphism .

The trivial character is the character modulo 1, and the principal character modulo , denoted , is the lifting of the trivial homomorphism .

A character  is called imprimitive if there exists some integer  with  such that the induced homomorphism  factors as

for some character ; otherwise,  is called primitive.

A character  is real (or quadratic) if it equals its complex conjugate  (defined as ), or equivalently if . The real primitive Dirichlet characters are in one-to-one correspondence with the Kronecker symbols  for  a fundamental discriminant (i.e., the discriminant of a quadratic number field). One way to define  is as the completely multiplicative arithmetic function determined by (for  prime):

It is thus common to write , which are real primitive characters modulo .

Classical zero-free regions 

For , Dirichlet L-functions can be expanded into an Euler product , from where it follows that  has no zeros in this region. This region is called the critical strip, and zeros in this region are called non-trivial zeros.

The classical theorem on zero-free regions (Grönwall, Landau, Titchmarsh) states that there exists an 
effectively computable real number  such that, writing  for the complex variable, the function  has no zeros in the region

if  is non-real. If  is real, then there is at most one zero in this region, which must necessarily be real and simple. This possible zero is the so-called Siegel zero.

The Generalized Riemann Hypothesis (GRH) claims that for every , all the non-trivial zeros of  lie on the line .

Defining "Siegel zeros" 

The definition of Siegel zeros as presented ties it to the constant  in the zero-free region. This often makes it tricky to deal with these objects, since in many situations the particular value of the constant  is of little concern. Hence, it is usual to work with more definite statements, either asserting or denying, the existence of an infinite family of such zeros, such as in:

The possibility of existence or non-existence of Siegel zeros has a large impact in closely related subjects of number theory, with the "no Siegel zeros" conjecture serving as a weaker (although powerful, and sometimes fully sufficient) substitute for GRH (see below for an example involving Siegel–Tatuzawa's Theorem and the idoneal number problem). An equivalent formulation of "no Siegel zeros" that does not reference zeros explicitly is the statement:

The equivalence can be deduced for example by using the zero-free regions and classical estimates for the number of non-trivial zeros of  up to a certain height.

Landau–Siegel estimates 

The first breakthrough in dealing with these zeros came from Landau, who showed that there exists an effectively computable constant  such that, for any  and  real primitive characters to distinct moduli, if  are real zeros of  respectively, then

This is saying that, if Siegel zeros exist, then they cannot be too numerous. The way this is proved is via a 'twisting' argument, which lifts the problem to the Dedekind zeta function of the biquadratic field . This technique is still largely applied in modern works.

However, in the same year, in the same issue of the same journal, Siegel directly improved this estimate to

Both Landau's and Siegel's proofs provide no explicit way to calculate , thus being instances of an ineffective result.

Siegel–Tatuzawa Theorem 
In 1951, Tikao Tatsuzawa proved an 'almost' effective version of Siegel's theorem, showing that for any fixed , if  then

with the possible exception of at most one fundamental discriminant. Using the 'almost effectivity' of this result, P. J. Weinberger (1973) showed that Euler's list of 65 idoneal numbers is complete except for at most two elements.

Relation to quadratic fields 
Siegel zeros often appear as more than an artificial issue in the argument for deducing zero-free regions, since zero-free region estimates enjoy deep connections to the arithmetic of quadratic fields. For instance, the identity  can be interpreted as an analytic formulation of quadratic reciprocity (see Artin reciprocity law §Statement in terms of L-functions). The precise relation between the distribution of zeros near  and arithmetic comes from Dirichlet's class number formula:

where:
Classical works in the subject treat these three quantities essentially interchangeably, although the case  brings additional complications related to the fundamental unit.

Siegel zeros as 'quadratic phenomena' 
There is a sense in which the difficulty associated to the phenomenon of Siegel zeros in general is entirely restricted to quadratic extensions. It is a consequence of the Kronecker–Weber theorem, for example, that the Dedekind zeta function  of an abelian number field  can be written as a product of Dirichlet L-functions. Thus, if  has a Siegel zero, there must be some subfield  with  such that  has a Siegel zero.

While for the non-abelian case  can only be factored into more complicated Artin L-functions, the same is true:

 Theorem (Stark, 1974). Let  be a number field of degree . There is a constant  ( if  is normal,  otherwise) such that, if there is a real  in the range

Here,  is the field discriminant of the extension .

"No Siegel zeros" for D < 0 
When dealing with quadratic fields, the case  tends to be elusive due to the behaviour of the fundamental unit. Thus, it is common to treat the cases  and  separately. Much more is known for the negative discriminant case:

Lower bounds for h(D) 
In 1918, Erich Hecke showed that "no Siegel zeros" for  implies that  (see Class number problem for comparison). This can be extended to an equivalence, as it is a consequence of Theorem 3 in Granville–Stark (2000):

where the summation runs over the reduced binary quadratic forms  of discriminant . Using this, Granville and Stark showed that a certain uniform formulation of the abc conjecture for number fields implies "no Siegel zeros" for negative discriminants.

In 1976, Dorian Goldfeld proved the following unconditional, effective lower bound for :

Complex multiplication 
Another equivalence for "no Siegel zeros" for  can be given in terms of upper bounds for heights of singular moduli:

where:
  is the absolute logarithmic naïve height for number fields;
  is the j-invariant function;
 .
This equivalence is a direct consequence of the results in Granville–Stark (2000), and can be seen in C. Táfula (2019).

where  denotes the Faltings height.

Consequences of Siegel zeros existing 
Although the Generalized Riemann Hypothesis is expected to be true, since the "no Siegel zeros" conjecture remains open, it is interesting to study what consequences such severe counterexamples to the GRH would imply. Another reason to study this possibility is that the proof of certain unconditional theorems require the division into two cases: first a proof assuming no Siegel zeros exist, then another assuming Siegel zeros do exist. A classical theorem of this type is Linnik's theorem on the smallest prime in an arithmetic progression.

The following are some examples of facts that follow from the existence of Siegel zeros.

Infinitude of twin primes 

A striking result in this direction is Roger Heath-Brown's 1983 result which, following Terence Tao, can be stated as follows:
 Theorem (Heath-Brown, 1983). At least one of the following is true: (1) There are no Siegel zeros. (2) There are infinitely many twin primes.

Parity problem 

The parity problem in sieve theory roughly refers to the fact that sieving arguments are, generally speaking, unable to tell if an integer has an even or odd number of prime divisors. This leads to many upper bounds in sieve estimates, such as the one from the linear sieve being off by a factor of 2 from the expected value. In 2020, Granville showed that under the assumption of the existence of Siegel zeros, the general upper bounds for the problem of sieving intervals are optimal, meaning that the extra factor of 2 coming from the parity phenomenon would thus not be an artificial limitation of the method.

See also
 Generalized Riemann hypothesis
 Deuring–Heilbronn phenomenon
 Class number problem
 Brauer–Siegel theorem
 Siegel–Walfisz theorem

References

 
 

 

Zeta and L-functions